Unsealed Alien Files is an American television series that premiered in 2011 in broadcast syndication in the United States.

Premise
Unsealed: Alien Files investigates released documents regarding UFO encounters, made accessible to the public in 2011 by the Freedom of Information Act. Each episode examines alien cases such as mass reports of UFO sightings, reports of personal abduction, purported government cover-ups, and related news from around the world.

See also
 List of topics characterized as pseudoscience
 Hangar 1: The UFO Files
 UFO Files
 UFO Hunters

 UFOs Declassified

References

External links
 

2011 American television series debuts
English-language television shows
History (American TV channel) original programming
UFO-related television